Harpendyreus berger is a butterfly in the family Lycaenidae. It is found in north-central Tanzania.

References

Endemic fauna of Tanzania
Butterflies described in 1976
Harpendyreus